Macarius (? – after 1391) was twice Ecumenical Patriarch of Constantinople (1376–1379, 1390–1391).

References

Bibliography 
 
 

14th-century patriarchs of Constantinople